Linda on My Mind is the thirty-second studio album by American country music singer Conway Twitty. The album was released in 1975, by MCA Records.

Track listing

Charts

Weekly charts

Year-end charts

References

1975 albums
Conway Twitty albums
MCA Records albums
Albums produced by Owen Bradley